The 1944–45 Chicago Black Hawks season was the team's 19th season in the NHL, and they were coming off an appearance in the 1944 Stanley Cup Finals, losing to the Montreal Canadiens in 4 games.

The Black Hawks would lose their top scorer Doug Bentley, who was given permission to stay home in Saskatchewan and tend the family farm by the Canadian Armed Forces officials, while his brother Max Bentley would miss his 2nd season due to World War II.  The club would name Clint Smith as team captain, and after the first game of the season, a loss of 11–5 against the Toronto Maple Leafs, head coach Paul Thompson was replaced by former Black Hawk captain Johnny Gottselig.

The Hawks would struggle to score goals, scoring a league low 141, while allowing 194, which ranked them 4th.  The team would finish the season with a 13–30–7 record, and their 33 points was their lowest point total since 1938–39.  Chicago would fail to make the post-season, as they would finish 3 points behind the Boston Bruins for 4th place.

Midway through the season, the Black Hawks would be involved in a big trade with the Detroit Red Wings, as Chicago would trade Earl Seibert and Fido Purpur to the Wings for Butch McDonald, Don Grosso, and Cully Simon.

Offensively, the Hawks were led by Bill Mosienko, who led the team with 28 goals, Clint Smith with his team high 31 assists, and the two of them would tie for the team lead in points at 54.  Pete Horeck would be the only other Black Hawk to score more than 10 goals, as he had 20.  Joe Cooper would lead the defense all season long, earning 21 points and a team high 50 penalty minutes.

In goal, the Hawks would bring back Mike Karakas, and he would lead the team with 12 wins and a 3.90 GAA, and earn 4 shutouts.  Doug Stevenson would appear in a couple of games, getting a 1–1–0 record with a GAA of 3.50.

Season standings

Record vs. opponents

Game log

Regular season

Season stats

Scoring leaders

Goaltending

References
SHRP Sports
The Internet Hockey Database
National Hockey League Guide & Record Book 2007

Notes

Chicago Blackhawks seasons
Chicago
Chicago